Shahrbanoo Amani Anganeh (born 1960) was a member of the Islamic Consultative Assembly for its fifth and sixth term from electoral district of Urmia from the Iranian reform movement. She was the senior adviser of Masoumeh Ebtekar, head of Environmental Protection Organization of Iran.

References

Living people
Iranian reformists
Iranian democracy activists
People from Urmia
1960 births
Executives of Construction Party politicians
Members of the Women's fraction of Islamic Consultative Assembly
Deputies of Urmia
Members of the 5th Islamic Consultative Assembly
Members of the 6th Islamic Consultative Assembly
Islamic Iran Solidarity Party politicians
20th-century Iranian women politicians
20th-century Iranian politicians
21st-century Iranian women politicians
21st-century Iranian politicians
Tehran Councillors 2017–